, formerly known as BTOP Thank Kuriyama, are a Japanese football club based in Kuriyama, Sorachi, Hokkaido. They play in the Hokkaido Soccer League. Despite playing in a league that holds an amateur status, the club's players and employees are currently signed on professional contracts.

History
The club was founded in 1998 as Sapporo Thank FC. A phoenix club, the club was formed from the dissolution of another Hokkaido club, Anfini Sapporo. Initially being from Sapporo, the club changed their hometown on 2004, moving to Kuriyama, a town on Hokkaido. After the hometown changed, the club became Thank FC Kuriyama. Until 2006, they played at the Hokkaido Soccer League, but got relegated after finishing on the league's 7th place.

From 2007 to 2021, they played at the Hokkaido Block Leagues, which can be considered Japan's 7th-tier league. At the start of the 2021 year, the club once again rebranded, now changing into BTOP Thank Kuriyama. Former J.League player Tetsuya Yano became the club's president, and the players were all signed into professional contracts.

On 2022, they debuted at one of the Japan's 5th-tier league, at its respective league of the Japanese Regional Leagues (conglomerate of all 9 existent regional leagues that can vary from 5th to 6th-tier, depending on the region), Hokkaido Soccer League. After signing experienced players to help the team, BTOP Thank Kuriyama immediately won the Hokkaido Soccer League title after being promoted, after a last effort was made on 25 September, beating Sapporo FC by 8–0. With this win, their got their first promotion opportunity to the Japan Football League, Japan's 4th division, via the 2022 Regional Champions League. They had qualified to the tournament by winning the Hokkaido League and by finishing as 2022 Shakaijin Cup runners-up., where they lost to Briobecca Urayasu by 5–3 on penalty shoot-outs, after a 0–0 tie in the regulation time.  Despite their efforts, they were eliminated in the group stage of the competition, losing all three matches by 2–1.

The club aspires to be the second team from Hokkaido to ever join the J.League in any of its current divisions, after Hokkaido Consadole Sapporo on 1998. The path to join the J1 League is much more difficult from before, as newly-founded teams have to climb from five or more leagues, to finally earn promotion for the J1 League. BTOP Thank Kuriyama, however, in high hopes, highlights their ambition to join the Japanese maximum level of professional football in back-to-back promotions by 2027.

On 13 March 2023, the club officially announced another name change, becoming BTOP Hokkaido. The club stated that the reasoning behind the change was "...to convey the charm of Hokkaido, which is full of dreams and vitality, through sports. (BTOP) will strive to grow into a team that is loved by everyone by involving the whole of Hokkaido by contributing to a wider range of areas through the team's activities."

Current squad

Coaching staff

Partners
List of partners and sponsors provided by BTOP Hokkaido:

Club record

Overall record

Key

Shakaijin Cup record

Regional Champions League record

Honours
Hokkaido Soccer League (1): 2022
Hokkaido Soccer League 2nd Division (1): 2001
North Hokkaido Block League (2): 2008, 2009
Central Hokkaido Block League (3): 2015, 2016, 2018
Central/North Hokkaido Block League (1): 2021

References

External links
Official Website
Official Instagram
Official Twitter
Official Youtube
Official Store

Football clubs in Japan
Association football clubs established in 1998
Sports teams in Hokkaido
1998 establishments in Japan